Tavares Washington (born April 20, 1983) is an American former college and professional football player who was a guard in the National Football League (NFL) for a single season in 2008.  He played college football for the University of Florida, and also played professionally for the Las Vegas Locomotives of the United Football League (UFL).

Washington was born in Greenville, Mississippi.  He attended South Delta High School in Rolling Fork, Mississippi, and played high school football for the South Delta Bulldogs.

He accepted an athletic scholarship to attend the University of Florida in Gainesville, Florida, where he played for coach Ron Zook and coach Urban Meyer's Florida Gators football teams from 2002 to 2005.

Washington was signed by the San Francisco 49ers as an undrafted free agent in 2006, and was a member of the 49ers' practice squad from 2006 to 2007.  He was released by the 49ers in 2008, signed by the Washington Redskins and released.  He was subsequently signed by the Kansas City Chiefs in 2008, and appeared in two of the Chiefs' regular season games.

He was a member of Las Vegas Locomotives of the UFL, and participated in the Locomotives' 2009 UFL championship.

External links 
 Tavares Washington – Florida Gators player profile
 Just Sports Stats

1983 births
Living people
American football offensive guards
American football offensive tackles
Florida Gators football players
Kansas City Chiefs players
Las Vegas Locomotives players
Sportspeople from Greenville, Mississippi
Players of American football from Mississippi
Rhein Fire players
San Francisco 49ers players
Washington Redskins players